HMS Swiftsure was the lead ship of the Swiftsure class battleships built in the late Victorian era.

Service history
She was commissioned at Devonport in 1871, initially for trials with the Channel Fleet. She was found to be almost unbeatable as a performer under sail, being bested only by the wooden-hulled frigate . She relieved  in the Dardanelles in 1872, and remained in the Mediterranean until 1878.

She was notable present at Tessloniki in the aftermath of the Salonika Incident. She paid off at Devonport and was given an extensive refit; being given a barque rig, torpedo equipment, a supplementary armament of 25-pounder breech loaders, and Admiral's Quarters to enable her to relieve Triumph as Pacific Station flagship, which she did from 1882 to 1885. She received new boilers at Devonport, and was then held in reserve until a second spell as Pacific flag from April 1888 until October 1890. She served thereafter in the reserve; in 1901 she became a stores hulk under the new name of Orontes. She was sold in 1908.

In the annual manoeuvres of 1893, Swiftsure asked permission from the Admiral to spread sail, as her engines were inadequate to generate the power required to produce the speed ordered. This was the last occasion in which a British battleship spread sail while travelling in company with a fleet at sea.

References

Bibliography
 

 

Swiftsure-class ironclads
Ships built on the River Tyne
1870 ships
Victorian-era battleships of the United Kingdom